Live is the first live album by former Small Faces and Faces keyboardist Ian McLagan, recorded live with his backing group, The Bump Band, at the KUT Studios in Austin, Texas.

Track listing
All tracks composed by Ian McLagan, except where indicated.

"Your Secret"
"You're So Rude" (McLagan, Ronnie Lane)
"Mystifies Me" (Ron Wood)
"Temperature" (Walter Jacobs)
"Glad and Sorry" (Ronnie Lane)
"Date with an Angel"
"I'm Hot, You're Cool"
"What'cha Gonna Do About It" (Ian Samwell-Porter)
"The Wrong Direction"
"Little Troublemaker" (Johnny Lee Schell)
"Little Girl" (McLagan, Ron Wood)

Personnel
Ian "Mac" McLagan - vocals, Hammond B3 organ, pianos
"Scrappy" Jud Newcomb - guitars, vocals
Mark Andes - bass guitar, vocals
Don Harvey - drums, vocals

Ian McLagan albums
2006 live albums